Esquimalt-Metchosin is a provincial electoral district for the Legislative Assembly of British Columbia, Canada. It first existed from 1991 to 2009, when it was succeeded by the electoral district of Esquimalt-Royal Roads. The riding was reconfigured and brought back in the 2015 electoral redistribution and was contested again in the 2017 election.

Demographics

Geography 
The Esquimalt-Metchosin electoral district is made up of the municipalities of Esquimalt, View Royal, Colwood, and Metchosin in western Greater Victoria.

History

Member of Legislative Assembly 

Its current MLA is Mitzi Dean, the former executive director for Pacific Centre Family Services. She was first elected in 2017. She represents the British Columbia New Democratic Party.

Election results 

|-
 
|NDP
|Moe Sihota
|align="right"|13,833
|align="right"|59.54%
|align="right"|
|align="right"|$48,615

|-

|Natural Law
|Sylvia Danyluk
|align="right"|60
|align="right"|0.26%
|align="right"|
|align="right"|$118

|Independent
|David M. Shebib
|align="right"|58
|align="right"|0.25%
|align="right"|
|align="right"|

|-
 
|NDP
|Moe Sihota
|align="right"|13,458
|align="right"|59.16%
|align="right"|
|align="right"|$84,498
|-

External links 
BC Stats Profile - 2001
Results of 2001 election (pdf)
2001 Expenditures
Results of 1996 election
1996 Expenditures
Results of 1991 election
1991 Expenditures
Website of the Legislative Assembly of British Columbia

References

British Columbia provincial electoral districts on Vancouver Island